The Match  is a 2021 Croatian-American sports historical drama directed by Dominik and Jakov Sedlar and starring Franco Nero, Armand Assante, and Caspar Phillipson. The film was inspired by true events which transpired in the spring of 1944.

Plot
To commemorate Adolf Hitler’s birthday, the Nazis organized a football match between an elite Nazi team and a squad of inmates from the camps made up of ex-footballers and political prisoners. Led by the former Hungarian football captain the team of prisoners are winning by virtue of their skills. During the half time they are given an assurance that they win freedom if they lose deliberately. However, despite all the obstacles confronting them, they are determined to win no matter what happens. The story is told in flashback by the last member of the team, then a boy, who manages to survive.

Cast 
 Franco Nero as Branko
 Caspar Phillipson as Colonel Franz
 Armand Assante as Commander
 Markus Gertken as General
 Viktor Kulhanek as Young Branko
 Andrej Dojkić as Laszlo Horvath
 Filip Tallhamn as Karolyi Faraco
 Philippe Reinhardt as Henckel
 Milton Welsh as Peter
 Paško Vukasović as Tibor
 Inva Mula as Magda Stekely
 Andrea Zirio as Sandor Stekely
 Robert Maaser as Hans Gruber
 Lujo Kunčević as Tomasz
 Mateo Kovačić as Footballer #1
 Dejan Lovren as Footballer #2
 Ivan Colarić as Janko

Release
The film premiered at The Jewish International Film Festival in New Zealand on July 25, 2021, and it was released theatrically in the United States, on October 29, 2021, by Mutiny Pictures. On December 2, 2021, the film had its television premiere on Showtime Networks.

Music
The film's soundtrack was composed by Croatian composer Dalibor Grubačević.  It was distributed under Plaza Mayor Company on August 20, 2021.

See also 
 The Death Match

References

External links 
 
 The Match at Mutiny Pictures

2021 films
American sports drama films
Films shot in Croatia
Prisoner of war films
2020s English-language films
2020s American films
Films directed by Jakov Sedlar